This is a complete list of Second World War military gliders. Only vehicles that reached at least the prototype stage are included in this list.

Argentina
 I.Ae. 25 Mañque, 13 soldliers and 2 crew. 1 built

Australia
 DHA-G1 and G2, experimental transport gliders.

Germany
Blohm & Voss BV 40 (1944), fighter prototype.
Blohm & Voss BV 246, glide bomb.  Not used operationally
DFS 230, light transport, 10 troops.
DFS 331, heavy freight glider prototype, 1 built.
Focke-Achgelis Fa 225, rotary wing glider. 1 built.
Gotha Go 242 (1941), transport, 23 troops. 1,528 built.
Gotha Go 244, motorised version of Go 242, 43 built and 133 Go 242B converted.
Gotha Go 345 (1944), troop glider prototype.
Gotha Ka 430, transport, 12 troops. 12 built.
Junkers Ju 322 (1941) heavy transport prototype, 140 troops. 2 built.
Messerschmitt Me 321 (1941), heavy transport 120 troops. 330 built.
Messerschmitt Me 323 (1942), motorised development of Me 321, 211 built

India
Hindustan Aircraft Limited G-1, prototype glider

Italy
 Aeronautica Lombarda AL.12P, 12 troops, 16 built (other source claims 2 prototypes, 6 on order, no delivered).
C.A.T. TM-2 glider, 20 troops (other source claims 10 troops), 2 built. See the italian page for the description of the glider.

Japan

Army
Kayaba Ku-2, tailless single seat, prototype
Kayaba Ku-3, tailless single seat, prototype
Kokusai Ku-7 Manazuru "Buzzard", heavy transport, 32 passengers
Kokusai Ku-8-II "Goose", troop transport 18 passengers and 2 crew
Maeda Ku-1-I Type 2, troop transport, 8 passengers and 2 crew
Nihon Kogata Ku-11, troop transport, 12 passengers and 2 crew
Yokosuka Ku-13, experimental "Shusui" light/heavy glider

Navy
Yokosuka MXY-5
Yokosuka MXY-6, testing Motor Glider
Yokosuka MXY8, "Akigusa", unpowered trainer for Mitsubishi J8M

Poland
Polikarpov BDP-2, 20 troops and 1 pilot, 2 built.

Soviet Union
Antonov A-7 (RF-8), 8 troops, 400 (approx) produced
Antonov A-40, flying tank, prototype
BDP (S-1) glider, 20 troops, 7 built.
Gribovski G-11, 11 troops, about 100 built 
KT-20 glider, 24 troops, 1 or possibly 2 built.
SAM-23 glider, 16 troops or a vehicle.
TS-25 glider, 25 troops or a vehicle. 6 built.

Sweden
 AB Flygindustri FI-3, 11 troops, 5 built.

Turkey
 THK-1 glider, 11 troops, prototype.

United Kingdom

Airspeed Horsa, 28 passengers and 2 crew or equivalent weight of cargo including small vehicles. 3,655 built.
Baynes Bat, (1943) experimental glider for testing design of a tank carrying glider
General Aircraft Hamilcar, (1942)  of cargo and 2 crew. 412 built.
General Aircraft Hamilcar Mk. X, Motorised version with 2x Bristol Mercury 31 of 965 hp. 22 examples converted
General Aircraft Hotspur, trainer 8 passengers and 2 crew. more than 1,000 built.
Slingsby Hengist, 15 passengers and 1 crew. 18 built.

United States

Allied Aviation XLRA
Bristol XLRQ, amphibious assault glider
Cornelius XFG-1, fuel carrier, 2 prototypes
Douglas XCG-17, prototype based on de-engined C-47 Skytrain.
General Airborne Transport XCG-16A
Laister-Kauffman XCG-10A "Trojan Horse" large transport glider. Some confusion as to the differences between the XCG-10 and the XCG-10A. 2 prototypes built and flown.
Piper LBP
Piper LNP
Pratt-Read LBE
Pratt-Read TG-32
Schweitzer LNS
St Louis CG-5, prototype only
Taylorcraft LBT
Taylorcraft LNT
Waco CG-3
Waco CG-4A Hadrian, 13 troops and 2 crew. More than 12,000 built, known in US Navy service as "Waco LRW-1"
Waco CG-13A
Waco CG-15

See also
 List of gliders
 List of aircraft of World War II
Glider snatch pick-up

References

 
Gliders